Andrzej Szal (10 January 1942 – 4 September 2015) was a Polish ice hockey player. He played for Podhale Nowy Targ and Legia Warsaw during his career. Szal also played for the Polish national team at the 1964 Winter Olympics and the 1966 World Championships. He died on 4 September 2015.

References

External links
 

1942 births
2015 deaths
Ice hockey players at the 1964 Winter Olympics
Legia Warsaw (ice hockey) players
Olympic ice hockey players of Poland
People from Nowy Targ
Podhale Nowy Targ players
Polish ice hockey forwards
Sportspeople from Lesser Poland Voivodeship